Talmer Bancorp was a bank holding company headquartered in Troy, Michigan. It was the parent company of Talmer Bank & Trust and operated banks in Michigan, Illinois, Indiana, and Ohio. In 2016, it was acquired by Chemical Financial (now TCF Financial Corporation).

History
The company was founded in 2007 as First Michigan Bank. 

First Michigan changed its name to Talmer in 2011 after acquiring banks outside of Michigan.

In 2013, Talmer acquired First Place Bank based in Warren, Ohio.

In 2014, it sold its Wisconsin branches to Hartland, Wisconsin-based Town Bank.

In 2015, Talmer acquired First Huron Corp and its subsidiary Signature Bank.

In 2016, the bank was acquired by Chemical Financial (now TCF Financial Corporation).

References

2016 mergers and acquisitions
Banks established in 2007
Banks based in Michigan
Defunct banks of the United States
Companies based in Troy, Michigan